Eduar Marriaga Campo is a Colombian boxer. At the 2012 Summer Olympics, he competed in the Men's lightweight, but was defeated in the first round.

References

Year of birth missing (living people)
Living people
Olympic boxers of Colombia
Boxers at the 2012 Summer Olympics
Lightweight boxers
Colombian male boxers